Raampur Ka Lakshman is a 1972 Indian Hindi-language romance drama film directed by Manmohan Desai. The film was remade in 1978 in Tamil, titled as Mangudi Minor.

Synopsis 
Kedarnath Bhargav, his wife, Laxmi, and two sons, Ram and Lakshman, are homeless. While traveling, their train derails, and the family is separated into three groups. Laxmi works as a maidservant in the house of Bombay's mayor and his daughter, Rekha. Ram is abducted by a career criminal. Kedarnath and Lakshman are together. Ratanlal Verma, a kind-hearted man with a son named Prakash, comes to Lakshman's rescue, is run over by a truck, and is crippled. Kedarnath and Lakshman relocate to Ratanlal's village, Raampur, and they live together as one family.

Years later, Prakash grows up and moves to Bombay, where he finds employment with a jeweler. When Ratanlal does not hear from him for two months, he asks Lakshman to go to Bombay and ensure that Prakash is all right. Upon arrival in Bombay, Lakshman finds out that Prakash has been arrested by the police for killing a man named Kundan Kumar. He is subsequently found guilty and sentenced to be hanged. Lakshman takes it upon himself to find out who actually killed Kundan. He dons the disguise of Louis D'Souza and gets himself enrolled in the Serpent Gang. Lakshman does not know that Kumar, the leader of this gang is none other than his brother Ram. When Laxman finds out, he must make a choice — whether to let innocent Prakash go to the gallows or to turn his own brother in to be hanged until death.

Cast 
Randhir Kapoor as Laxman Bhargav 
Rekha as Rekha Chaudhary
Shatrughan Sinha as Ram Bhargav / Kumar
Padma Khanna as Julie
Ranjeet as Peter
Manmohan Krishan as Kedarnath Bhargav
Sulochana Latkar as Laxmi Bhargav
Raj Mehra as Mayor Chaudhary
Roopesh Kumar as Chhaganlal Pandey
Ramesh Deo as Prakash Verma
Randhir as Ratanlal Verma
Faryal as Cabaret Dancer
Shyam Kumar as Louis D'Souza
Viju Khote as Micheal
Ramayan Tiwari as Ram's Abductor
Bhushan Tiwari as Bhushan
Ranvir Raj as Police Inspector

Music 
The song "Kaahe Apnon Ke" samples the Romance theme from the Lieutenant Kijé Suite by Russian composer Sergei Prokofiev.

References

External links

 
 

1972 films
1970s Hindi-language films
Films directed by Manmohan Desai
Films scored by R. D. Burman
Hindi films remade in other languages
Indian romantic drama films